Edmonson is a town in Hale County, Texas, United States. The population was 111 at the 2010 census.

Geography

Edmonson is located in northern Hale County at  (34.281695, –101.900998). Texas State Highway 194 runs through the town, leading southeast  to Plainview, the county seat, and northwest  to Dimmitt.

Demographics

2020 census

As of the 2020 United States census, there were 86 people, 34 households, and 20 families residing in the town.

2000 census
As of the census of 2000, there were 123 people, 37 households, and 34 families residing in the town. The population density was 283.4 people per square mile (110.4/km2). There were 43 housing units at an average density of 99.1 per square mile (38.6/km2). The racial makeup of the town was 85.37% White, 14.63% from other races. Hispanic or Latino of any race were 49.59% of the population.

There were 37 households, out of which 48.6% had children under the age of 18 living with them, 81.1% were married couples living together, 2.7% had a female householder with no husband present, and 8.1% were non-families. 8.1% of all households were made up of individuals, and 8.1% had someone living alone who was 65 years of age or older. The average household size was 3.32 and the average family size was 3.50.

In the town, the population was spread out, with 34.1% under the age of 18, 9.8% from 18 to 24, 25.2% from 25 to 44, 17.9% from 45 to 64, and 13.0% who were 65 years of age or older. The median age was 30 years. For every 100 females, there were 105.0 males. For every 100 females age 18 and over, there were 102.5 males.

The median income for a household in the town was $31,250, and the median income for a family was $29,583. Males had a median income of $21,389 versus $9,773 for females. The per capita income for the town was $9,857. There were 6.3% of families and 13.7% of the population living below the poverty line, including 17.9% of under eighteens and 16.7% of those over 64.

Education
The town of Edmonson is served by the Plainview Independent School District.

Notable people

 Gary Painter, sheriff of Midland County, who warned in 2014 about ISIS terrorism, was reared in Edmonson on a family farm

References

Towns in Hale County, Texas
Towns in Texas